Second Wife is a 1936 film directed by Edward Killy and starring Gertrude Michael and Walter Abel.

Reception
It made a profit of $58,000.

References

External links
Second Wife at IMDb
Second Wife at TCMDB

1936 films
1936 drama films
American drama films
American black-and-white films
Films directed by Edward Killy
1930s American films